The Romany is a 1923 British silent adventure film directed by Floyd Martin Thornton and starring Victor McLaglen, Irene Norman and Harvey Braban.

Cast
 Victor McLaglen as The Chief 
 Irene Norman as Valia 
 Harvey Braban as Andrew MacDonald 
 Peggy Hathaway as Flora 
 Malcolm Tod as Robbie 
 Ida Fane as Zilla 
 Hugh E. Wright  
 Harry Agar Lyons   
 N. Watt-Phillips

References

Bibliography
 Low, Rachael. History of the British Film, 1918-1929. George Allen & Unwin, 1971.

External links

1923 films
1923 adventure films
British adventure films
British silent feature films
1920s English-language films
Films directed by Floyd Martin Thornton
British black-and-white films
1920s British films
Silent adventure films